The 2018 California Superintendent of Public Instruction primary election was held on June 5, 2018, to elect the Superintendent of Public Instruction of California. Unlike most other elections in California, the superintendent is not elected under the state's "top-two primary". Instead, the officially nonpartisan position is elected via a general election, with a runoff held on November 6, 2018, because no candidate received a majority of the vote.

The previous incumbent, Superintendent Tom Torlakson, was term-limited, so could not seek re-election to a third term. As no candidate received a majority in the general election, a runoff was held between two Democrats: Marshall Tuck and Tony Thurmond. Thurmond narrowly defeated Tuck.

General election

Candidates

Declared
 Steven Ireland
 Lily Ploski, former educator and administrator
 Tony Thurmond, Democratic State Assemblyman
 Marshall Tuck, former CEO of Partnership for LA Schools, former president of Green Dot Public Schools and candidate in 2014
 Douglas I. Vigil (write-in)
 Thomas L. Williams (write-in)

Declined
 Natalia Sanchez, NASA Jet Propulsion Laboratory engineer

Endorsements

Results

Runoff

Candidates
 Tony Thurmond, Democratic State Assemblyman
 Marshall Tuck, former CEO of Partnership for LA Schools, former president of Green Dot Public Schools and candidate in 2014

Endorsements

Polling

Results

See also
California Department of Education

References

External links
Official campaign websites
 Tony Thurmond for Superintendent
 Marshall Tuck for Superintendent

Superintendent
California Superintendent of Public Instruction elections
California